Stand by All Networks is a 1942 American thriller film directed by Lew Landers and starring Florence Rice, John Beal and Margaret Hayes. The films sets were designed by Lionel Banks.

Synopsis
Before Pearl Harbor, a radio reporter is fired by his station for his "alarmist" broadcasts. He investigates a suspected ring of Nazi saboteurs on his own.

Cast
 Florence Rice as Frances Prescott 
 John Beal as Ben Fallon 
 Margaret Hayes as Lela Cramer 
 Alan Baxter as Victor 
 Mary Treen as Nora Cassidy 
 Pierre Watkin as Grant Neeley 
 Tim Ryan as Police Inspector Ryan 
 Boyd Davis as Colonel Stanton 
 Kenneth MacDonald as Captain Banion 
 Patrick McVey as Monty Johnson
 Ernie Adams as Sockeye Schaefer
 Sven Hugo Borg as Sailor 
 Lloyd Bridges as Slim Terry
 Eddie Laughton as Joe
 Peter Brocco as Cab Driver
 Lee Shumway as Cop 
 John Tyrrell as Watchman
 Lester Dorr as Bartender
 Rick Vallin as Sound Control Room Engineer

References

Bibliography
 Michael S. Shull. Hollywood War Films, 1937–1945: An Exhaustive Filmography of American Feature-Length Motion Pictures Relating to World War II. McFarland, 2006.

External links

1942 films
1940s thriller films
American thriller films
Columbia Pictures films
World War II spy films
World War II films made in wartime
Films directed by Lew Landers
1940s English-language films
1940s American films